Diocese of Ohio usually refers to the Episcopal Diocese of Ohio.

Other dioceses in Ohio include:
Episcopal Diocese of Southern Ohio
Roman Catholic Archdiocese of Cincinnati
Roman Catholic Diocese of Cleveland
Roman Catholic Diocese of Columbus
Roman Catholic Diocese of Steubenville
Roman Catholic Diocese of Toledo
Roman Catholic Diocese of Youngstown